E. Raja  is an Indian politician and an International Weight Lifter. He was elected from Sankarankoil constituency as a candidate of the DMK.He defeated the AIADMK candidate V. M. Rajalakshmi .  She served as minister for Department of Adi Dravidar and Tribal Welfare (Tamil Nadu) during AIADMK rule from 2016 to 2021 . After 30 years, DMK captured the constituency. 

Raja won the Bronze Medal in the  Asian Games Weightlifting held at Turkey in 2021. He has qualified for participating in the Commonwealth Games through this.

References 

Tamil Nadu MLAs 2021–2026
Dravida Munnetra Kazhagam politicians
Year of birth missing (living people)
Living people